Leroy Aziz Sané (born 11 January 1996) is a German professional footballer who plays as a winger for  club Bayern Munich and the German national team. Considered one of the best wingers in the world, Sané is known for his exceptional pace, dribbling ability and clinical finishing.

Sané made his professional debut for Schalke 04 in 2014 and transferred to Manchester City in 2016 for an initial £37 million fee. He was voted PFA Young Player of the Year in 2017–18, becoming the first and only German player to win the award, after helping City win the Premier League and EFL Cup, a feat the side bettered by winning a domestic treble the following season.

Sané made his senior international debut for Germany in November 2015 and was part of their squad that reached the semi-finals of UEFA Euro 2016.

Early life
Sané was born on 11 January 1996 in Essen, Germany and was raised near the Lohrheidestadion, Wattenscheid. He is the son of former German rhythmic gymnast and 1984 Summer Olympics bronze medalist Regina Weber, and former footballer and Senegalese international Souleymane Sané. He was named Leroy in honour of Claude Le Roy, a former head coach of his father. His father met his mother while playing professionally for SG Wattenscheid 09. Souleymane Sané was raised in France; he moved to Germany through his service in the French Army. Sané's two brothers, Kim and Sidi, have played for the youth side or second XI of major German football clubs.

Club career

Early career
Sané began playing football in 2001 for the youth team of SG Wattenscheid 09. In 2005, he joined Schalke 04. Three years later, he joined Bayer Leverkusen, before returning to the Schalke youth academy (Nachwuchsleistungszentrum) in 2011.

Schalke 04

On 21 March 2014, Sané signed a three-year professional contract with Schalke ending on 30 June 2017. He made his Bundesliga debut on 20 April 2014 against VfB Stuttgart. He replaced Max Meyer after 77 minutes in a 3–1 away defeat. He scored his first goal of the season in a 2–1 home defeat to 1. FC Köln on 13 December. On 11 March 2015, Sané scored in his first UEFA Champions League match in a 4–3 victory over Real Madrid, although his side were knocked out of the competition on 5–4 aggregate.

Manchester City

2016–17: Debut season
On 2 August 2016, Sané joined Premier League club Manchester City, signing a five-year contract for a reported £37 million transfer fee, with performance-related add-ons potentially making the fee £46.5 million. He made his debut in a 1–2 win in the Manchester derby against Manchester United on 10 September. His first goal for City came in a 2–1 home win against Arsenal in the Premier League on 18 December. Following a spell on the sidelines due to injury, Sané made his return in a game against Tottenham Hotspur and scored in the 2–2 draw at the City of Manchester Stadium on 21 January 2017. On 28 January, he scored in a 3–0 away win over Crystal Palace in the FA Cup fourth round match.

On 21 February, Sané scored in a 5–3 comeback win over Monaco in the Champions League round of 16 first leg match. On 1 March, he scored in a 5–1 home win over Huddersfield Town in the FA Cup fifth round replay match. Four days later, on 5 March, he scored in a 2–0 away win over Sunderland. On 15 March, Sané scored in the return fixture of the Champions League tie against Monaco; however, City lost 1–3, knocking them out from the tournament on away goals. On 2 April, Sané scored the opening goal in an eventual 2–2 draw with Arsenal. On 15 April, he scored in a 3–0 win over Southampton.

In July 2017, Sané said he believed his debut season at City had been limited by his inability to breathe through his nose. He said he particularly suffered during matches, with his constantly blocked nose hampering his performance and causing him intense frustration. He opted to have corrective surgery during the off-season break. Although this caused him to miss that year's FIFA Confederations Cup, he said his chronic nasal congestion was becoming increasingly unbearable for him and that he wished to enter the next season feeling happy and healthy.

2017–19: Back-to-back league titles

On 9 September 2017, Sané scored his first two goals of the 2017–18 season in City's 5–0 home win against Liverpool. On 20 September, he scored twice in a 2–1 away win over West Bromwich Albionin the third round match of the League Cup. On 23 September, he scored in a 5–0 win over Crystal Palace. On 14 October, he scored in a 7–2 win over Stoke City. On 21 October, he scored in a 3–0 win over Burnley. On 28 October, he scored in a 3–2 away win over West Bromwich Albion. After scoring and assisting once in each of his three matches, he earned the Premier League Player of the Month award for October 2017. On 6 January 2018, he scored in a 4–1 win in the FA Cup third round over Burnley. On 14 January, he scored in a 4–3 defeat to Liverpool. Nine days later, on 23 January, he scored in a 3–2 away win over Bristol City, securing advancement into the League Cup final, in which he played 77 minutes before being substituted off as City won 3–0 over Arsenal to clinch their first trophy under Pep Guardiola. On 1 March, five days following the win in the final, he scored against Arsenal in a 3–0 league away win. On 31 March, he scored in a 3–1 away win over Everton, putting City just a win away from winning the league title. On 29 April, he scored in a 4–1 away win over West Ham United.

Sané was voted the PFA Young Player of the Year for his part in Manchester City's 2017–18 Premier League title win, edging teammates Raheem Sterling and Ederson, as well as Tottenham Hotspur's Harry Kane. With 15 assists, Sané just missed out on winning the inaugural Premier League Playmaker of the Season award to fellow teammate Kevin De Bruyne.

On 15 September 2018, Sané scored the opening goal and his first of the 2018–19 season in City's 3–0 home win against Fulham. He later scored the final goal in consecutive home match wins over Burnley and Southampton. On 24 November, Sané assisted a first-half goal for Sterling and scored a brace in a 4–0 away win over West Ham United.

On 3 January 2019, he scored the winning goal for Manchester City in the 72nd minute of the game against Liverpool, which resulted in Liverpool's first and only league defeat of the season. On 21 February 2019, Manchester City were 2–1 down in the first leg of the Champions League round of 16 tie against Sané's former club, Schalke, playing with only 10 men after Nicolás Otamendi was sent off on the 68th minute. Sané levelled the scores with a stunning free kick from just under 30 yards only seven minutes after being substituted for Sergio Agüero. He chose not to celebrate out of respect for his former club. City went on to win the game 3–2 with the winning goal scored by Raheem Sterling.

On 13 March 2019, in the second leg of the Champions League round of 16 clash against Schalke, Sané put in an incredible performance with three assists and a goal to contribute to Manchester City's 7–0 victory against his former club, sending City to the quarter-finals of the competition. On 24 April 2019, Sané scored the second and final goal in a match against Manchester United during the 66th minute to secure City a Manchester derby win. It was his first Manchester derby goal.

2019–20: Injury
Sané was repeatedly linked with Bundesliga champions Bayern Munich to replace club staples Franck Ribéry, who was leaving the club, and retiring Arjen Robben. Despite a deal to the German side reportedly being nearly finalized, Sané was named in the starting 11 against Liverpool in the FA Community Shield. After only 10 minutes, Sané was substituted after sustaining a torn ACL, ruling him out for the majority of the season and ending talks with Bayern until his injury healed. In June 2020, Sané rejected a contract extension at Manchester City, with Guardiola stating that Sané would leave the club in the summer.

Bayern Munich
On 3 July 2020, Bayern Munich agreed to sign a five-year deal with Sané for an initial €45 million with add-ons rising to a potential €60 million. Sané scored on his second Bundesliga debut in an 8–0 win against former club Schalke 04. On 3 November 2020, Sané scored his first Champions League goal for Bayern Munich in a 6–2 away win over Red Bull Salzburg in the 2020–21 season.

In the 2021–22 Champions League season, he scored six goals and provided six assists in ten matches including three goals in two matches against Benfica. On 7 September 2022, he scored a goal and had his shot deflected to an own goal in a 2–0 away win against Inter Milan in the first match of the 2022–23 UEFA Champions League. On 4 October 2022, he scored a brace in a 5–0 win over Viktoria Plzeň, to reach his 20th goal in the Champions League.

International career

Youth

Sané was first called up to the Germany under-21 team by youth coach Horst Hrubesch on 28 August 2015 for the friendly against Denmark and for the 2017 UEFA European Under-21 Championship qualifier against Azerbaijan. On 3 September 2015, he made his debut for the German U21 side in a 2–1 win at Stadion an der Lohmühle in Lübeck against Denmark, where he was replaced after 73 minutes by Julian Brandt.

Senior
Sané received his first senior call-up to the German senior team on 6 November 2015 in a friendly against France. Sané was eligible to play for France, due to also holding French citizenship. On 13 November 2015, he was substituted in the 61st-minute for Julian Draxler in a friendly match against France in Saint-Denis in a 2–0 defeat for the Germans that was overshadowed by shootings and explosions around the stadium.

Sané was selected by Germany boss Joachim Löw to represent the country at UEFA Euro 2016. He participated in one match, replacing Bastian Schweinsteiger in the 79th minute in Germany's 2–0 semi-final defeat to France.

Sané was omitted from Germany's final 23-man squad for the 2018 FIFA World Cup in favour of another young player, Julian Brandt, on 4 June 2018. In September 2018, after he was selected for the squad to face games against France and Peru, he left the team hotel after a discussion with Joachim Löw, citing "personal reasons" as his cause for leaving. It was later revealed that the reason for leaving was due to the birth of his daughter.

On 16 November 2018, he scored his first goal for Germany against Russia following an assist from Serge Gnabry. The goal came in the eighth minute of the game as Germany won 3–0. On 19 May 2021, he was selected to the squad for the UEFA Euro 2020.

Career statistics

Club

International

Germany score listed first, score column indicates score after each Sané goal.

Honours
Manchester City
Premier League: 2017–18, 2018–19
FA Cup: 2018–19
EFL Cup: 2017–18, 2018–19
FA Community Shield: 2018, 2019

Bayern Munich
Bundesliga: 2020–21, 2021–22
DFL-Supercup: 2021, 2022
UEFA Super Cup: 2020
FIFA Club World Cup: 2020
	
Germany
FIFA Confederations Cup: 2017

Individual
PFA Young Player of the Year: 2017–18
Premier League Player of the Month: October 2017
VDV Newcomer of the Season: 2014–15
UEFA Champions League Fantasy Football Team of the Season: 2021–22

References

External links

Profile at the FC Bayern Munich website

1996 births
Living people
Footballers from Essen
German footballers
Germany youth international footballers
Germany under-21 international footballers
Germany international footballers
Association football wingers
FC Schalke 04 II players
FC Schalke 04 players
Manchester City F.C. players
FC Bayern Munich footballers
Bundesliga players
Premier League players
FA Cup Final players
UEFA Euro 2016 players
UEFA Euro 2020 players
2022 FIFA World Cup players
German expatriate footballers
Expatriate footballers in England
German expatriate sportspeople in England
German people of Senegalese descent
German people of French descent
German sportspeople of African descent
Black French sportspeople
French people of German descent
French sportspeople of Senegalese descent